Stampe is a surname of German origin. Notable people with the surname include:

John Stampe (1957–2012), Danish football player and coach
Rigmor Stampe (1850–1923), Danish baroness, writer and philanthropist
Veronika Stampe East German retired slalom canoeist

See also
Stampe et Vertongen, a Belgian aircraft manufacturer
Stampee also called "stampe", a coin made by overstamping another foreign coin

References

Surnames of German origin